Chrysanthoglossum is a genus of flowering plants belonging to the family Asteraceae.

Its native range is Northern Africa.

Species:

Chrysanthoglossum deserticola 
Chrysanthoglossum trifurcatum

References

Anthemideae
Asteraceae genera